The 1893 Illinois Fighting Illini football team was an American football team that represented the University of Illinois during the 1893 college football season.  In their second season under head coach Edward K. Hall, the Illini compiled a 3–2–3 record.  End George H. Atherton was the team captain.

Schedule

Roster

Source: University of Illinois

References

Illinois
Illinois Fighting Illini football seasons
Illinois Fighting Illini football